The Tampa Southern Railroad was a subsidiary of the Atlantic Coast Line Railroad (ACL) originally running from Uceta Yard in Tampa south to Palmetto, Bradenton, and Sarasota with a later extension southeast to Fort Ogden in the Peace River valley built shortly after.  It was one of many rail lines completed during the Florida land boom of the 1920s.  Most of the remaining trackage (between Tampa and Bradenton) now serves as CSX Transportation's Palmetto Subdivision.  Another short portion just east of Sarasota also remains that is now operated by Seminole Gulf Railway.

History

The Tampa Southern Railroad was chartered on January 31, 1917, and incorporated on March 5, 1917, as a subsidiary of the Atlantic Coast Line Railroad (ACL), who already had a sizeable network in Florida.  The officers of the new company were all ACL officers, and were reelected at several subsequent shareholders meetings. The Tampa Southern would principally compete with the Seaboard Air Line Railroad's (SAL) parallel Sarasota Subdivision that ran from Durant to Venice which had been serving Bradenton and Sarasota since 1903. 

The Tampa Southern's crews began work soon after incorporation and the company's leadership projected that trains could be running by the start of 1918. Bradenton granted a right-of-way through its city and land for a station and other supporting structures there in early January 1918. The first train from Tampa to Palmetto ran on December 5, 1918. The railroad reached Bradenton and used it as its terminus, carrying through Pullman sleepers from connecting Atlantic Coast Line trains. The tracks were completed to Sarasota by May 1924, and the first passenger train arrived in Sarasota in December of that year.

The Tampa Southern began at the ACL's Uceta Yard in Tampa and ran south, paralleling the east shore of Tampa Bay.  Just northeast of Palmetto, a loop was constructed through Ellenton to serve agricultural growers.  Known as the "Ellenton Belt Line", the now abandoned loop branched off the main line near Rubonia and ran in a roughly rectangular trajectory through Ellenton before returning to the main line in Palmetto.  A short spur to Terra Ceia, which is now abandoned, also existed near this area.

South of Palmetto, the tracks crossed the Manatee River on a bascule bridge into Bradenton, with Bradenton's passenger depot (which still stands today and serves as a medical clinic) built just south of the bridge.  The tracks then turned southeast for a short distance and crossed the SAL's track before turning south again and into Sarasota near Fruitville.

In 1928, a spur to the Payne Terminal at Hog Creek was built just north of the Sarasota passenger depot (which was located at Main Street and School Avenue).  The Seaboard Air Line attempted to block the ACL from accessing the terminal since it had three spur tracks there that the ACL would have to cross.  Since these spurs were on city property, the city authorized their removal to so the ACL to build their spur to the terminal.

Extension to Fort Ogden
With optimism for the company's petition to the Interstate Commerce Commission, in 1925 surveyors were plotting a line beyond Sarasota to connect with Florida's east coast. By 1927, the line was extended southeast from Sarasota to Fort Ogden in Desoto County.  From the Sarasota depot, the line turned east through Fruitville, briefly running directly beside the Seaboard line before that line turned south towards Venice.  Once out of Sarasota, the line turned southeast passing through Utopia before crossing the Myakka River and continuing through Honore and Sidell.  It crossed the Seaboard Air Line Railroad's Boca Grande Subdivision at Platt.  The line then crossed Peace River just before merging with the ACL's Lakeland–Fort Myers Line at Southfort (just south of Fort Ogden).  Today, Desoto County Road 761 runs along the former right of way from the Peace River to Fort Ogden.  Freight stations were built at Belspur, Palmersville, Honore, and Sidell.  The extension included a spur to the Ringling Bros. and Barnum & Bailey Circus Sarasota headquarters near Fruitville.  The extension also served Palmer Farms and their packinghouse at Belspur.  Adrian Honore, brother of local socialite Bertha Honore Palmer, also owned significant amounts of land along the line east of Sarasota.  

While freight was the primary intent of the Fort Ogden extension, it ended up having the additional benefit of providing a direct route for passenger trains traveling from Tampa and Sarasota further down the coast to Fort Myers and Naples.  The extension would initially serve a pair of passenger trains from Tampa Union Station to Fort Myers and Naples that included through Pullman coaches from the Dixie Limited and the Palmetto.

Most of the Fort Ogden extension was removed by 1949 since it did not generate the freight traffic the Atlantic Coast Line had hoped for.  The line was truncated at Belspur just east of Fruitville.

Later years

By 1949, the line had daily service from Tampa Union Station to Sarasota by the Atlantic Coast Line's West Coast Champion as well as a daily local passenger train. Two freight trains also ran to Sarasota six days a week.

In 1967, the Atlantic Coast Line Railroad merged with the Seaboard Air Line to form the Seaboard Coast Line Railroad (SCL).  Connections were established between the Tampa Southern and the Seaboard route in a number of locations.  Former Tampa Southern track from Bradenton to Matoaka was removed and the parallel east-west track through Fruitville was consolidated on to the former SAL track.  The Tampa Southern track from Fruitville to Belspur would remain as a spur until the late 1970s.

The merger also resulted in the removal of the SAL's swing bridge over the Manatee River (which was located a short distance upstream of both the Tampa Southern's bascule bridge and the Desoto Bridge).  The city of Bradenton unsuccessfully attempted to have the Seaboard Coast Line remove the Tampa Southern bridge instead since it went right through downtown Bradenton's waterfront.

The Tampa Southern route (as well as the remaining SAL route south from Bradenton to Venice) was then designated as the Palmetto Subdivision by the Seaboard Coast Line after the merger.  It became the main route for all trains between Palmetto and Tampa since it provided a more direct route to the Tampa yards.  The Champion continued to run the line and continued south to Venice after the merger.  All passenger service ended in 1971 after all of the Seaboard Coast Line's passenger operations were taken over by Amtrak.  The line would later become the route of Tropicana's Juice Train, which was originally operated on the former Seaboard Air Line tracks to bypass Tampa.  The juice train continues to run the line today.

At the north end, the line was connected with the S Line (the former SAL main line) into Yeoman Yard, the Seaboard Air Line's classification yard that subsequently became the Seaboard Coast Line's main yard.  Uceta Yard, the Atlantic Coast Line's main yard, has since become an intermodal terminal and car storage facility.  The connection with the A Line (the former ACL main line) was severed after the cessation of passenger service. 

In 1980, the Seaboard Coast Line's parent company merged with the Chessie System, creating the CSX Corporation.  The CSX Corporation initially operated the Chessie and Seaboard Systems separately until 1986, when they were merged into CSX Transportation.  The Seaboard Air Line's original route between Durant and Willow was then removed in 1986, leaving the Tampa Southern route as the only thru route.

Current operations

Most of the remaining Tampa Southern Railroad trackage from Tampa to Bradenton comprises CSX's Palmetto Subdivision, with the northernmost five miles being part of the Tampa Terminal Subdivision.  A control point on the line between State Road 60 and Yeoman Yard is named "TS," a reference to the Tampa Southern.

The line today serves The Mosaic Company's Riverview plant near the Alafia River, TECO Energy's Big Bend Power Station in southern Hillsoborough County, and Port Manatee in northern Manatee County.  It also continues to serve the Tropicana Juice Plant in Bradenton, with Tropicana's Juice Train continuing to be the most consistent service on the line today.

The main Tampa Southern Railroad tracks end near the Tropicana Plant in Bradenton.  Although, the Palmetto Subdivision continues south from here a short distance to Oneco along the former Seaboard line. In Oneco, it connects with Seminole Gulf Railway, who operates the remaining Seaboard tracks south through Sarasota.  Seminole Gulf also operates a discontinuous segment of the Tampa Southern Railroad just east of Downtown Sarasota.  It is part of their track from Sarasota to Matoaka.  US 301 now runs on the roughly five-mile abandoned segment between of the Tampa Southern between Bradenton and Matoaka.

Historic Stations

See also
 List of CSX Transportation lines

Notes

References

CSX Transportation lines
Defunct Florida railroads
Atlantic Coast Line Railroad
Predecessors of the Atlantic Coast Line Railroad
Railway companies established in 1917
Railway companies disestablished in 1967
1917 establishments in Florida
1967 disestablishments in Florida